Frank Leo Mason III (born April 3, 1994) is an American professional basketball player for SLUC Nancy Basket of the LNB Pro A. He played college basketball for the University of Kansas, where he was the starting point guard for the Jayhawks. For the 2016–17 season, he was the consensus National Player of the Year
 He was also a consensus All-American selection for his senior season at Kansas.

Mason was selected 34th overall in the 2017 NBA draft by the Sacramento Kings, where he spent two seasons before signing with the Milwaukee Bucks as a free agent in July 2019. He signed with the Orlando Magic in February 2021.

Early life
Mason grew up in Petersburg, Virginia and went to Petersburg High School. He scored 1,901 points in his four-year career at Petersburg, which is the second-highest scoring total in school history behind Hall of Famer Moses Malone.

Mason had originally signed to attend Towson University in Towson, Maryland during his senior year, but he lost his eligibility after failing a government class. Mason attended Massanutten Military Academy in Woodstock, Virginia to make up for the failing grade in government. After being discovered playing the Amateur Athletic Union circuit by Kansas Assistant Coach Kurtis Townsend, Mason was offered a scholarship by the University of Kansas.

College career
As a sophomore at Kansas, he was a second team All Big 12 selection. He averaged 12.6 points, 3.9 rebounds, and 3.9 assists per game as a sophomore, an increase from the 5.5 points, 1.3 rebounds, and 2.1 assists per game he averaged as a freshman.

During his junior season, Mason averaged 12.9 points and 4.6 assists and was named to the Big 12 All-Defensive Team.

During his senior season, Mason took on more of a leadership role on the Kansas team, becoming the first player in Big 12 history to average 20 points and 5 assists a game during the regular season. His regular season culminated in receiving multiple awards. He was unanimously selected as the Big 12 Player of the Year, averaging 20.5 points and 5.1 assists in the regular season. He was also consensus first team All-American selection, the NCAA-leading 29th first-team selection in Kansas basketball history. He was the consensus National Player of the Year.

Professional career

Sacramento Kings (2017–2019)
Mason was drafted by the Sacramento Kings with the 34th pick in the 2017 NBA draft. He played in the NBA Summer League for the Kings, where he scored 24 points in 24 minutes against the Los Angeles Lakers on July 10, 2017, adding 6 assists, 5 rebounds and 2 steals. For the full 2017–18 regular NBA season, Mason averaged 7.9 points, 2.5 rebounds and 2.8 assists in 52 games.

Mason was waived by the Kings on July 4, 2019.

Milwaukee Bucks (2019–2020)
Mason signed a two-way contract with the Milwaukee Bucks on July 26, 2019. In the deal, he split time between the Bucks and their NBA G League affiliate, the Wisconsin Herd. In the G League, he scored 44 points in a win over the Grand Rapids Drive on February 19, 2020.

Mason was awarded the NBA G League MVP for the 2019–20 season on June 25, 2020. He averaged 26.4 points, 5.0 assists and 3.4 rebounds per game with the Herd.

Orlando Magic (2021)
On December 18, 2020, Mason signed with the Philadelphia 76ers, but was waived the next day and signed with their NBA G League affiliate, the Delaware Blue Coats. However, on February 3, 2021 the Orlando Magic signed him to a two-way contract right before the beginning of the G League season. However, Mason was waived on February 15 after playing in four games. Two days later, he was re-acquired by Delaware, but was waived on March 5 after suffering a season-ending injury. He didn't log any minutes with the Blue Coats.

South Bay Lakers (2021–2022)
Mason joined the Philadelphia 76ers for the 2021 NBA Summer League.

On October 13, 2021, Mason signed with the Los Angeles Lakers and was waived the following day. On October 23, he signed with the South Bay Lakers as an affiliate player. In seven games, he averaged 9.1 points, 3.0 rebounds and 3.3 assists per game.

Wisconsin Herd (2022)
On February 24, 2022, Mason was traded, along with a 2022 first-round pick, to the Wisconsin Herd in exchange for Tremont Waters and a 2022 second-round pick.

Beirut Club (2022–2023)
In Summer 2022, he signed with Beirut Club of the Lebanese Basketball League.

SLUC Nancy (2023–present)
On January 15, 2023, he signed with SLUC Nancy Basket of the LNB Pro A.

National team career
Mason and the Kansas Jayhawks competed on behalf of the United States in the 2015 World University Games. He scored 18 points in a double-overtime victory over Germany in the gold medal game and received the Finals MVP award.

Personal life
Mason grew up in the housing project of Pin Oak Estates located in Petersburg, Virginia, where he developed his game and earned the nickname "The Phenom" by local onlookers within the community. Mason has a son named Amari.

Career statistics

NBA

Regular season

|-
| style="text-align:left;"| 
| style="text-align:left;"| Sacramento
|| 52 || 2 || 18.9 || .379 || .360 || .817 || 2.5 || 2.8 || .7 || .2 || 7.9
|-
| style="text-align:left;"| 
| style="text-align:left;"| Sacramento
|| 38 || 0 || 11.4 || .420 || .219 || .684 || 1.1 || 2.2 || .4 || .1 || 5.1
|-
| style="text-align:left;"| 
| style="text-align:left;"| Milwaukee
|| 9 || 0 || 13.1 || .451 || .286 || .588 || 2.1 || 3.2 || .6 || .1 || 6.9
|-
| style="text-align:left;"| 
| style="text-align:left;"| Orlando
|| 4 || 1 || 19.8 || .375 || .400 || .714 || 3.0 || 3.0 || .0 || .0 || 6.3
|- class="sortbottom"
| style="text-align:center;" colspan="2"| Career
|| 103 || 3 || 15.7 || .396 || .301 || .755 || 2.0 || 2.6 || .5 || .1 || 6.7

Playoffs

|-
| style="text-align:left;"| 2020
| style="text-align:left;"| Milwaukee
| 2 || 0 || 1.0 ||  ||  ||  || .0 || 0.5 || .0 || .0 || .0 
|- class="sortbottom"
| style="text-align:center;" colspan="2"| Career
| 2 || 0 || 1.0 ||  ||  ||  || .0 || 0.5 || .0 || .0 || .0

College

|-
| style="text-align:left;"| 2013–14
| style="text-align:left;"| Kansas
|| 35 || 3 || 16.1 || .417 || .327 || .662 || 1.3 || 2.1 || .5 || .0 || 5.5
|-
| style="text-align:left;"| 2014–15 
| style="text-align:left;"| Kansas
|| 36 || 36 || 33.5 || .441 || .429 || .786 || 3.9 || 3.9 || 1.4 || .1 || 12.6
|-
| style="text-align:left;"| 2015–16 
| style="text-align:left;"| Kansas 
|| 38 || 38 || 33.5 || .434 || .381 || .739 || 4.3 || 4.6 || 1.3 || .1 || 12.9
|-
| style="text-align:left;"| 2016–17
| style="text-align:left;"| Kansas
|| 36 || 36 || 36.1 || .490 || .471 || .794 || 4.2 || 5.2 || 1.3 || .1 || 20.9
|- class="sortbottom"
| style="text-align:center;" colspan="2"| Career
|| 145 || 113 || 30.0 || .454 || .420 || .761 || 3.4 || 4.0 || 1.1 || .1 || 13.0

References

External links

1994 births
Living people
21st-century African-American sportspeople
African-American basketball players
All-American college men's basketball players
American men's basketball players
Basketball players from Virginia
Kansas Jayhawks men's basketball players
Medalists at the 2015 Summer Universiade
Milwaukee Bucks players
Orlando Magic players
Point guards
Sacramento Kings draft picks
Sacramento Kings players
SLUC Nancy Basket players
South Bay Lakers players
Sportspeople from Petersburg, Virginia
Universiade medalists in basketball
United States men's national basketball team players
Universiade gold medalists for the United States
Wisconsin Herd players